Hydriomena speciosata is a moth of the  family Geometridae. It is found from coastal British Columbia south to California. The habitat consists of wet conifer forests.

The wingspan is about 36 mm. The forewings have alternating bands of green and black. Adults are on wing in midsummer.

The larvae feed on the foliage of Pinaceae species, including Abies grandis, Picea, Pinus, Pseudotsuga menziesii and Tsuga heterophylla. Mature larvae reach a length of 20 mm. They have a cream coloured body, overlain with dark mottling and a brown head. The species overwinters as a mid instar larva. Pupation takes place in May or June.

References

Moths described in 1874
Hydriomena